Mary Ellen Wilson (March 1864 – October 30, 1956) also called Mary Ellen McCormack was an American whose case of child abuse led to the creation of the New York Society for the Prevention of Cruelty to Children. At the age of eight, she was severely abused by her foster parents, Francis and Mary Connolly. Because she was assisted by Henry Bergh, then the head of the American Society for the Prevention of Cruelty to Animals, some sources incorrectly state that statutes against cruelty to animals had to be used to remove her from the home. Hers was the first documented case of child abuse in the United States.

Biography
Mary Ellen was born in March 1864 to Frances Connor Wilson and Thomas Wilson of Hell's Kitchen in New York City. Frances Connor immigrated from England to New York City in 1858 and met Irishman Thomas Wilson. The couple married in April 1862, soon after Thomas was drafted into the 69th New York, a regiment of the Irish Brigade. Following Thomas's death during the war, Frances had to take a job, and was no longer able to stay at home to raise her infant daughter. She boarded her daughter, a common practice at the time, with a woman named Martha Score. When Frances Wilson's financial situation worsened, she began to miss her visitation dates with her daughter and was no longer able to make child care payments to Score. Score turned Mary Ellen, now almost two, into the New York City Department of Charities.

The Department placed Mary Ellen under the care of Thomas and Mary McCormack, a couple who had lost three children to slum-bred diseases. McCormack boasted he had fathered children by another woman, and on January 2, 1866, the McCormacks went to the Department of Charities, and claimed Mary Ellen Wilson was Thomas McCormack's daughter.  The Department of Charities placed Mary Ellen into the McCormacks' care. Thomas McCormack signed an "indenture" agreement upon retrieving Mary Ellen from the Department of Charities' care. The McCormacks were required to report the child's condition annually to the department, but this only occurred once or twice during Mary Ellen's stay.

Shortly after gaining custody of the girl Thomas McCormack died. His widow then married Francis Connolly.

Investigation into abuse
The Connollys and Mary Ellen moved to an apartment on West 41st Street. It was at this address that neighbors first became aware of young Mary Ellen's mistreatment. Her foster mother forced her to do heavy labor, repeatedly beat, burned, and cut the child and locked her in a closet. When the Connollys moved to a new address, one of the concerned neighbors from their 41st Street apartment asked Etta Angell Wheeler, a Methodist missionary who worked in the area, to check in on the child. Under the pretext of asking Mrs. Connolly's help in caring for Connolly's new neighbor, the chronically ill and home-bound Mary Smitt, Wheeler gained access to the Connollys' apartment to witness Mary Ellen's state for herself. When Ms. Wheeler saw evidence of severe physical abuse, malnourishment, and neglect in Mary Ellen's condition—she was seen barefoot in the winter, for example—Wheeler began to research legal options to redress the abuse and protect the young girl. After finding the local authorities reluctant to act upon the child cruelty laws currently in place, Wheeler turned to a local advocate for the animal humane movement and the founder of the American Society for the Prevention of Cruelty to Animals, Henry Bergh. With the help of neighbors' testimony, Wheeler and Bergh removed Mary Ellen from the Connolly home using a writ of homine replegiando and took Mary Connolly to trial.

New York State Supreme Court
Elbridge Thomas Gerry of American Society for the Prevention of Cruelty to Animals took her case to the New York State Supreme Court in 1874. At the time of the trial, Mary Ellen was ten years of age.

The deliberate cruelties and deprivations inflicted on Mary Ellen Wilson by her adopted parents included the following:
 regular and severe beatings with a rawhide 
 burnings 
 struck with scissors 
 insufficient food
 being forced to sleep on the floor
 having no warm clothes to wear in cold weather
 being frequently left alone inside a darkened, locked room
 being forbidden to go outdoors, except at night in her own yard
 forced to do heavy labor

On April 9, 1874, the child testified in court regarding the abuse she had suffered:

A jury convicted Mrs. Connolly of assault and battery and the judge sentenced her to one year in prison. That year, the New York Society for the Prevention of Cruelty to Children was founded, the first organization of its kind.

Later life and death
Following the conviction of Mary Connolly, Mary Ellen was initially placed in a juvenile home before Etta Wheeler and her relatives successfully obtained custody of her.

Wheeler later wrote:
"The child was an interesting study, so long shut within four walls and now in a new world. Woods, fields, 'green things growing,' were all strange to her, she had not known them. She had to learn, as a baby does, to walk upon the ground – she had walked only upon floors, and her eye told her nothing of uneven surfaces."

In 1888, when Mary Ellen was twenty-four, she married Lewis Schutt, a widower with three children. They had two daughters, Etta (named after the woman who rescued Mary Ellen), and Florence. The couple also adopted an orphaned girl named Eunice.

Her daughter Florence remembered Mary Ellen as being solemn, but someone who "came alive whenever she listened to Irish jigs and especially to The Irish Washerwoman."

She lived to the age of ninety-two, and died on October 30, 1956.

See also

 Child abuse
 Physical abuse
 Timeline of young people's rights in the United States

References

Further reading

External links
 American Humane Association
 Waifs and Strays, The New York Times, April 11, 1874
 Mary Ellen Wilson; Further Testimony As To The Child's Ill Treatment By Her Guardians, The New York Times, April 12, 1874
 Mary Ellen Wilson; Further Testimony In The Case—Two Indictments Found Against Mrs. Connolly By The Grand Jury, The New York Times, April 14, 1874
 Our City Charities Versus The Case Of Mary Ellen, The New York Times, April 16, 1874
 Prevention Of Cruelty To Children, The New York Times, April 17, 1874
 Mary Ellen Wilson; Mrs. Connolly, the Guardian, Found Guilty, And Sentenced To One Year's Imprisonment At Hard Labor, The New York Times, April 28, 1874
 Out of the Darkness: The Story of Mary Ellen Wilson, Print, Kindle and Audiobook links at Amazon.com.

1864 births
1956 deaths
Child abuse in the United States
Crimes in New York City
New York Supreme Court
Crimes in Manhattan